The German Historical Institute London (GHIL) is one of the nine independent academic research institutes of the German Historical Institute that are part of the Max Weber Foundation.

Foundation
The creation of the institute was the idea of the German archivist Carl Haase in 1968. A German-British Historical Association was founded in 1969 and, after  gaining funding by the German government in 1975,  the GHIL officially opened on 4 November 1976.

Activities
The Institute promotes research on "medieval and modern history, in particular on the comparative history of Britain and Germany, on the British Empire and the Commonwealth, and on Anglo-German relations."

It is located at 17 Bloomsbury Square and includes a public library specialising in German history.

Directors
The directors of the Institute have been:
Paul Kluke August 1975 - July 1977
Wolfgang Mommsen August 1977 - July 1985
Adolf M. Birke August 1977 - July 1985
Peter Wende September 1994 - August 2000
Hagen Schulze September 2000 - August 2006
Andreas Gestrich - September 2006 to August 2018
 - September 2018 to date

See also
Germany–United Kingdom relations
German Association for British Studies
German History Society

References

External links

Official website.

 
Historiography of Germany
Organisations based in London
History institutes
1976 establishments in England
Germany–United Kingdom relations